Josephine is an unincorporated community in Benson County, North Dakota, United States. Since its name was changed in 1901, the unincorporated community takes its name from physician Josephin Lindstrom Stickleberger, a resident of Oberon, though in its history, minister Jean Baptiste was its namesake before the name was changed for the first time to Jenin in order to honour Marie Jenin, a pioneer and missionary. The original post office closed in 1906, reopened months later, and stayed open until 1943. According to satellite imagery from 1949, the town had what appears to be an abandoned school, multiple other abandoned buildings, and two grain elevators. All that remains today is both elevators and an accompanying business office.

References

Unincorporated communities in North Dakota
Unincorporated communities in Benson County, North Dakota